Rodolfo Fortino de Araújo  (born 30 April 1983), is a Brazilian-born Italian futsal player who plays for FF Napoli and the Italian national futsal team.

References

External links 

Sporting CP profile

1983 births
Living people
Italian men's futsal players
Brazilian men's futsal players
Brazilian expatriates in Italy
Brazilian emigrants to Italy
Luparense Calcio a 5 players
Sporting CP futsal players
Brazilian people of Italian descent
Italian expatriate sportspeople in Portugal